Antonio L. Cabangon-Chua (August 30, 1934 – March 11, 2016)  was a Filipino businessman, Philippine ambassador to Laos under the administration of former president Gloria Macapagal Arroyo, and reserved colonel of the Armed Forces of the Philippines, being an honorary member of Philippine Military Academy class of 1956. He graduated from the University of the East in the same year, with a Bachelor of Science in Business Administration degree. 

He received a doctorate in the Humanities, honoris causa, from the Adamson University.

Career 
He was a certified public accountant. His business interests include real estate, hotel, broadcasting, print media, banking and insurance. He founded Citystate Savings Bank, Fortune Life Insurance Co. Inc., Eternal Plans, Citystate Properties and Management Corp., and Isuzu GenCars, Inc.

"Ka Tony" Cabangon–Chua was also a tri-media magnate, having owned some business interests related to media, including newspaper BusinessMirror, tabloid Filipino Mirror, magazines Philippine Graphic Weekly, View and Cook, and the radio network Aliw Broadcasting Corporation that operates AM radio station DWIZ and FM radio station Home Radio 97.9. 

He was also the chairman of Nine Media Corporation, the media company behind CNN Philippines and Radio Philippines Network, as he acquired the 34% stake of RPN from Solar Entertainment Corporation in 2014 due to the Tieng's loss of revenue after investing on RPN. He was also the chairman and president of the Catholic Mass Media Awards Foundation, appointed by former Manila archbishop Cardinal Jaime Sin from 2000 until his death.

In October 2014, Cabangon–Chua led the successful negotiations between the TV network and CNN International, that paved way for the launch of CNN Philippines, a free-to-air TV news channel currently aired on RPN-9.

In 2015, the Kapisanan ng mga Brodkaster ng Pilipinas (KBP) awarded Cabangon-Chua with the Lifetime Achievement Award for his remarkable contributions in the broadcasting business as the founder and chairman emeritus of ABC. 

On the same year, the Catholic Mass Media Awards confers the Special Award for Devoted Service to the Church through the Mass Media award to Cabangon-Chua.

Death
Cabangon–Chua died on March 11, 2016. He was 81.

References

1934 births
2016 deaths
20th-century Filipino businesspeople
Filipino diplomats
Filipino media executives
People from Manila
People from Mandaluyong
Ambassadors of the Philippines to Laos
University of the East alumni
Filipino company founders
Filipino people of Chinese descent
21st-century Filipino businesspeople